The Artvin Dam an arch-gravity dam on the Çoruh River in Artvin Province, Turkey. Preliminary construction on the dam began in December 2010 and the river diversion tunnels were complete in July 2012 at which time construction on the dam foundation started. The purpose of the dam is hydroelectric power generation and its power station has an installed capacity of 340 MW when completed. The dam is part of the Çoruh Development Plan and its construction was supervised by Turkey's State Hydraulic Works. The dam began to impound its reservoir in October 2015 and the power station was commissioned beginning in January 2016.

See also

Yusufeli Dam – under construction upstream
Deriner Dam – downstream

References

Dams in Artvin Province
Arch-gravity dams
Hydroelectric power stations in Turkey
Dams on the Çoruh River
Dams completed in 2016
Energy infrastructure completed in 2016
2016 establishments in Turkey
21st-century architecture in Turkey